Quechualla District is one of eleven districts of the province La Unión in Peru.

References